Hunter Hale (born June 25, 1997) is an American professional basketball player for Borac Čačak of the Basketball League of Serbia and the ABA League. He played college basketball for Central Michigan, Grand Valley State, and Winthrop.

High school career
Hale attended Kalamazoo Central High School, where Isaiah Livers was a teammate of his. He trained in basketball with his uncle at the Bronson Athletic Club in Kalamazoo, Michigan, alongside older brothers H'Ian and Herschal. Hale was undersized and lightly recruited out of high school. He was nominated to the McDonald's All-American Game. Hale averaged 14 points, three rebounds and three assists per game as a senior, leading Kalamazoo Central to a 23–2 record and its second consecutive appearance in the Class A regional finals.

College career
Hale walked on to the basketball team at Central Michigan. He scored a total of eight points in 11 games as a freshman. After Marcus Keene was recruited to the team, Hale redshirted his sophomore season and subsequently opted to transfer to Division II Grand Valley State. He was named to the Second Team All-GLIAC as a sophomore after averaging 12.9 points per game. As a junior, Hale helped the Lakers win a GLIAC championship and he was named tournament MVP. He averaged 17.0 points, 4.2 rebounds, 3.0 assists and 2.3 steals per game, earning First Team All-GLIAC honors. Hale was noticed by Pat Kelsey at Winthrop, and he decided to transfer to the Eagles for his final year of eligibility. Despite leading his conference in steals, he said he needed to improve his defense when coming to Division I. On January 2, 2020, he scored a career-high 29 points in a 91–67 win against Longwood. Hale led the team in scoring with 13.9 points per game, while also averaging 3.6 assists per game on a team that finished 24–10. He was named Big South Tournament MVP after leading Winthrop to a championship. However, the NCAA Tournament was cancelled due to the COVID-19 pandemic.

Professional career
On February 11, 2021, Hale signed his first professional contract with the Nelson Giants of the New Zealand National Basketball League. On May 22, he scored 41 points in an overtime win against the Otago Nuggets. Hale led the league in scoring with 26.9 points per game, and was named to the NBL All-Star Five.

On August 6, 2021, Hale signed with Borac Čačak of the Basketball League of Serbia and the ABA League.

References

External links
Winthrop Eagles bio
Grand Valley State Lakers bio
Central Michigan Chippewas bio

1997 births
Living people
ABA League players
American men's basketball players
American expatriate basketball people in New Zealand
American expatriate basketball people in Serbia
Basketball players from Michigan
Central Michigan Chippewas men's basketball players
Grand Valley State Lakers men's basketball players
KK Borac Čačak players
Winthrop Eagles men's basketball players
Nelson Giants players
Sportspeople from Kalamazoo, Michigan
Shooting guards